The Top End Australian Football Association (TEAFA) was an amateur Australian rules football competition in the Northern Territory, Australia.

More recently in 2010/11, the TEAFA merged with the NTFL creating a three tiered competition with teams being represented in Premier Division and Division 1 and 2.

See also
AFL Northern Territory
Northern Territory Football League

References

External links
 

Australian rules football competitions in the Northern Territory